Hyperolius bopeleti, also known as the Dizangue reed frog or Bopelet's reed frog, is a species of frog in the family Hyperoliidae. It is endemic to the coastal southwestern Cameroon. The specific name bopeleti honours M. Bopelet, a Cameroonian biologist.

Description
The body and limbs are warty. The snout is blunt. The fingers and the toes are partially webbed and bear terminal discs. The dorsum is grey with a darker hourglass-like pattern. The belly is blue-green. Males have yellow throat. This species does not show sex- or phase-related colour polymorphism.

The male advertisement call is a high-pithced, metallic click.

Habitat and conservation
Reproduction takes place in small pools. Clutches of about 100 eggs are deposited high above the water (4–5 m) into which the larvae eventually fall.

Although this species appears adaptable, it is uncommon and its range is small; expanding agriculture and human settlements are probable threats to it. It is not known to occur in any protected areas.

References

bopeleti
Frogs of Africa
Amphibians of Cameroon
Endemic fauna of Cameroon
Amphibians described in 1980
Taxa named by Jean-Louis Amiet
Taxonomy articles created by Polbot